All Hail is the eighth studio album by American metalcore band Norma Jean. The album was released on October 25, 2019 through Solid State Records, the band's sixth overall release on the label. It is the last album to feature guitarist Jeff Hickey, as well as the first to feature guitarist Grayson Stewart and drummer Matt Marquez.

Recording and production
All Hail was recorded by producer Will Putney at Graphic Nature Audio in Belleville, New Jersey.

Release
The album was announced July 17, 2019, with the first single off the album, [Mind Over Mind], debuting two days later on July 19, 2019. The band would later release a music video for [Mind Over Mind] on August 9, 2019. The second single, Landslide Defeater, released on August 15, 2019. A third single, "/with_errors", was released on September 19, 2019. The album's fourth single, "Safety Last", was released on October 4, 2019.

Track listing

Personnel
Norma Jean
 Cory Brandan – vocals, guitar, bass
 Jeff Hickey – guitar, bass
 Grayson Stewart – guitar, bass
 Matt Marquez – drums, auxiliary percussion

Additional musicians
 Matthew Putman – drums/percussion, production, engineering, songwriting

Production
 Will Putney – producer

References

2019 albums
Norma Jean (band) albums
Solid State Records albums
Albums produced by Will Putney